Dino Eze (born 1 June 1984, in Port Harcourt) is a Nigerian former footballer who played as a midfielder.

References

External links
 
 
 
 

1984 births
Igbo sportspeople
Living people
Nigerian footballers
Nigerian expatriate footballers
PFC Beroe Stara Zagora players
PFC Lokomotiv Plovdiv players
FCV Farul Constanța players
FC UTA Arad players
FC Gloria Buzău players
FC Steaua București players
Expatriate footballers in Bulgaria
Expatriate footballers in Romania
First Professional Football League (Bulgaria) players
Liga I players
Liga II players
Association football midfielders
Nigerian expatriate sportspeople in Romania
FC Dinamo București players
FC Politehnica Iași (2010) players
Sportspeople from Port Harcourt